James Riker (New York City, May 11, 1822 – 1889) was a New York historian and genealogist. His father, James Riker (Snr) was a merchant and landowner descended from early Dutch settlers. Riker left school at the age of sixteen to work in his father's business.

During the late 1830s and early 1840s he lived intermittently in Goshen, New York, where he ran a store. By the mid-1840s he had settled at the family home on Delancey Street in Manhattan. There Riker studied informally for the Presbyterian ministry and began the genealogical and historical research that would occupy him for much of his life. He collected original documents from the colonial era, copied extracts from documents in state and local archives and corresponded extensively with historians, relatives and old family friends. In 1848 Riker moved with his father to a new family home near to the corner of Fifth Ave. and 125th Street, Harlem. Two years later, having given up his plans for a religious career, he began work as a teacher in New York's Ward School 24. James Riker's first publication, a pamphlet genealogy that traced the Riker family to their early Dutch origins, appeared in 1851. He followed it with a substantial volume of local history, The Annals of Newtown (1852). Riker married Vashti Wood Horton in 1853, and the couple had several children. Vashti died in 1864, and Riker was re-married in 1867 to Anna C. Clute. Several years later Riker moved to Waverly, New York where he established the Waverly Library and Museum, and wrote two additional historical works, Harlem (city of New York): its origin and early annals (1881) and Evacuation Day, 1783, with Recollections of Capt. John Van Arsdale, of the Veteran Corps of Artillery (1883). In his later years Riker struggled financially and was forced to auction off a substantial portion of his library. James Riker died in 1889. James Riker's younger brother was the Civil War Colonel John Lafayette Riker who organized the New York Volunteer Regiment known as the Anderson Zouaves.

List of published works
A Brief History of the Riker Family, from Their First Emigration to This Country in the Year 1638, to the Present Time (1851)
The Annals of Newtown (1852)
Harlem (city of New York): its origin and early annals (1881)
Evacuation Day, 1783, with Recollections of Capt. John Van Arsdale, of the Veteran Corps of Artillery (1883)

References

External links

People from Harlem
19th-century American historians
19th-century American male writers
1822 births
1889 deaths
People from Goshen, New York
Historians from New York (state)
Historians of New York City
American male non-fiction writers